Mindaugas Bilius (born 13 February 1982) is a Lithuanian Paralympic athlete with cerebral palsy. He represented Lithuania at the 2012 Summer Paralympics and at the 2016 Summer Paralympics and he won two medals, both in 2016: the gold medal in the men's shot put F37 event and the silver medal in the men's discus throw F37 event.

At the 2017 World Championships he won the gold medal in the men's shot put F37 event.

References

External links 
 

Living people
1982 births
Place of birth missing (living people)
Lithuanian male discus throwers
Lithuanian male shot putters
Track and field athletes with cerebral palsy
Athletes (track and field) at the 2012 Summer Paralympics
Athletes (track and field) at the 2016 Summer Paralympics
Medalists at the 2016 Summer Paralympics
Paralympic gold medalists for Lithuania
Paralympic silver medalists for Lithuania
Paralympic medalists in athletics (track and field)
Paralympic athletes of Lithuania